O. pubescens may refer to:
 Oenothera pubescens, the South American evening-primrose, a plant species native to the Southwestern United States
 Ophryosporus pubescens, a flowering plant species found in Peru
 Opuntia pubescens, a cactus species in the genus Opuntia
 Otholobium pubescens, a plant species found in Peru